Lisa Snowdon (born Lisa Snawdon, 23 January 1972) is an English television and radio presenter and fashion model. She was the host of the Living TV reality television show Britain's Next Top Model from 2006 until 2009. She also co-presented Capital Breakfast on Capital London from August 2008 until 18 December 2015.

Early life
Snowdon was born in Welwyn Garden City to insurance salesman Nigel and hairdresser Lydia Snawdon. She has two younger sisters.

She gained a scholarship to the Italia Conti Academy of Theatre Arts, where her classmates included Naomi Campbell. She auditioned for the Minipops. After gaining too much additional height, and after her parents split up when she was 17, Snowdon stayed in London and worked briefly as a dance and yoga teacher.

Modelling
A fan of Christy Turlington from age 14, Snowdon never thought about becoming a model. Spotted by a Premier Model Management agent at age 19 while pole-dancing at a rave at London's MFI club, she was auditioned and signed up. She started working with renowned photographers and became one of Britain's top fashion models.

Snowdon is best known for her beauty commercials and high-fashion cover and spread modelling, including cover shots for Later, Vogue, Marie Claire and Elle; she was also the face for Gucci. She went on to be the "elevator girl" for Lynx deodorant (Axe in certain countries) in 2003, appeared in advertisements for Mercedes-Benz, Dove soap, and Kelloggs Special K, and was the face of campaigns for Neutrogena and After Eight mint straws, the Taxiwise safety campaign and numerous catalogues. Her modelling career led to appearances in Maxim, Arena, Loaded and GQ. She featured on FHM'''s List of FHM 100 Sexiest Women every year between 1996 and 2007 except for 1998.

Snowdon returned to modelling when she became the face and model of Avon lingerie, and was one of the models for the Marks & Spencer autumn 2010 campaign. From 2010-2014 she was the face of Belvita breakfast biscuits, having appeared in adverts for the biscuits with fellow Capital FM DJ Johnny Vaughan. In 2015 she was appointed the lead-UK model for Triumph International.

Television
Snowdon's first presenting role was on MTV UK's MTV Select. She took over the role from Lisa Butcher as the "supermodel" judge and host on Britain's Next Top Model. Snowdon left the show to concentrate on her radio show and was replaced by Elle Macpherson as of season six. In autumn 2007, she was announced as the new co-presenter of Through the Keyhole with Sir David Frost on BBC One.

Snowdon had a starring role in Channel 4's short film Man's Best Friend. She also had a cameo role in Channel 4 programme, Plus One.

In 2014, Snowdon co-hosted Weekend Kitchen with Waitrose with Steve Jones. The show aired on Saturday mornings on Channel 4.

In August 2016, Snowdon guest presented five episodes of Lorraine, standing in for Lorraine Kelly. In November 2016, Snowdon was confirmed as a contestant for the sixteenth series of I'm a Celebrity...Get Me Out of Here!. She was voted off as the second celebrity to leave the jungle coming in second last place to her camp-mate Danny Baker.

In September 2022, Snowdon was crowned winner of the seventeenth series of Celebrity Masterchef.

Strictly Come Dancing

Snowdon took part in the sixth series of Strictly Come Dancing on the BBC paired with former champion Brendan Cole.

Radio
At the end of August 2008, it was announced that Snowdon was to be the permanent replacement for Denise van Outen on Capital London as co-host with Jonny Vaughan. In January 2010, the pair signed a two-year deal to continue presenting the show. On 1 December 2011 it was confirmed she would remain at Capital. She was given the nickname 'Eggy' on the show by colleague Dave Berry after her penchant for boiled eggs and the smell they gave in the studio. On 13 November 2015, she announced that she would be leaving Capital Breakfast at the end of 2015.

Charitable activities
In 2005, Snowdon became an ambassador for the Breast Cancer Care charity.Breast Cancer Care  

In 2008, Snowdon participated in a celebrity edition of The Apprentice'' as part of the BBC's biennial Sport Relief event. In 2010, she became an Ambassador of Capital FM's Help a Capital Child charity.

In November 2010, after turning on the Bond Street Christmas Lights, Snowdon was rushed to hospital and diagnosed with viral meningitis. As a result, she began raising money and acting as an ambassador for the Meningitis Trust.

Personal life
Snowdon dated Dave Loeffler from US band E.Y.C. for three years. She was also in a five-year on/off relationship with actor George Clooney from 2000 until 2005. Their relationship was well reported in the tabloids on both sides of the Atlantic. After 14 months of dating, Snowdon revealed in 2017 her engagement to her boyfriend George Smart. When Snowdon appeared on I'm a Celebrity...Get Me Out of Here!, she revealed that a series of difficult relationships were what put her off having children.

Snowdon lives in Epping Forest, and has a flat in Camden, north London, which she uses during the week.

See also
 List of I'm a Celebrity...Get Me Out of Here! (British TV series) contestants
 List of Strictly Come Dancing contestants

References

External links 
Official website
Capital Breakfast at capitalfm.com
 

1972 births
Living people
English television actresses
English female models
English television presenters
Alumni of the Italia Conti Academy of Theatre Arts
People from Welwyn Garden City
Capital (radio network)
English radio DJs
British women radio presenters
I'm a Celebrity...Get Me Out of Here! (British TV series) participants
Top of the Pops presenters